Sjömansjul på Hawaii, also known as "Jag en ensam sjöman är" or "Det är julkväll på Hawaii", is a Christmas song, with lyrics by Helge Roundquist (signature "Miguel Torres") and music by Yngve Stoor. The lyrics describe a Swedish sailor visiting Hawaii at Christmastime, and longs back home to Sweden when the sailors celebrate Christmas on board their boat, moored to a wharf while the Sunshine.

The song was recorded by Yngve Stoor and became one of the most popular Swedish songs of 1945, despite being seasonal.

Other recordings
Sven-Ingvars (1965)
Trio Me' Bumba (1973)
Lalla Hansson (1979)
Hasse Andersson (1986)
Lars Vegas trio (1992)
Christer Sjögren (1994)
Gösta Linderholm & the Trad Brothers (1994, failed Svensktoppen on 14 December 2002  )
Black-Ingvars (1995)

References

 Information at Svensk mediedatabas
 Information at Svensk mediedatabas

Songs about Hawaii
1945 singles
Swedish Christmas songs
Swedish-language songs
Sven-Ingvars songs
Christer Sjögren songs
Hasse Andersson songs